Freddy Zemmour (born 21 February 1942) is a French former professional footballer who played as a midfielder.

Club career

Freddy Zemmour began playing football at the age of nine with Gallia Sports Algérois and was Algiers Department Champion in the three categories, Minimes, Cadets and Juniors. He spent his first senior year at Gallia d'Alger in 1961–62. That year, he played with Achour Salah, Ghazi Djermane, Abdelghani Zitouni, Nassou and Boubekeur Belbekri. After the independence of Algeria became a soldier in the French army in El Harrach, Belbekri who played with him in Gallia d'Alger and during his visit to his mother to ask him to join him at the USM Alger, at Bologhine stadium. At that time, come out regularly from the military barracks to see his mother One day he went to train with USM Alger and was greeted by his friend Belbekri and coach Abdelaziz Ben Tifour. In the 1962–63 season he won his only title with USM Alger after winning the National 1 final against MC Alger 3-0 but did not participate in the game.

Later in 1964, he told his coach Ben Tifour that he wanted to become a professional player in France, His answer was clear "I will talk about you at Nice but I warn you, prepare to eat black bread" But Nice's answer was that he did not need a midfielder at the time so he stayed with USM Alger. In 1964 in a match in Batna, Zemmour was attacked by one of the players in the locker room but all his teammates protected him It was the only time he was subjected to a racist incident because he was French and Jewish religion, two things that are very sensitive in Algeria so far. In one of his statements he said "My decision to leave USM Alger and Algeria was not easy to make. But I have always been a "man of duty", and I had to focus on my professional career for the well being of my wife and children".

Personal life
Freddy Zemmour was born on 21 February 1942 in Algiers, at 9 rue Adolphe Blasselle, in Belcourt. He got married on 24 October 1964 at the Consulate of France in Algiers. He then lived in 22 bd Bougara until August 1968, after which he left to France. On 18 January 1965 his son Bruno was born in Algiers, clinical Avenue Claude Debussy. His daughter, Sandrine, was born on 30 January 1969 in St Maur des Fosses (Paris region). He left Algeria in 1968 because Zemmour and his wife wanted to get closer to their families who had left Algeria between 62 and 68.

Honours

Club
 USM Alger
 Championnat National (1): 1962–63

Career statistics

Club

References

External links
Profile on USM Alger.com 
Profile on elmoudjahid.com Archive 

1942 births
French footballers
Footballers from Algiers
USM Alger players
Living people
Association football midfielders
21st-century Algerian people